Sathinee Chankrachangwong (born 25 June 1982) is a badminton player from Thailand.

Chankrachangwong competed in badminton at the 2004 Summer Olympics in women's doubles with partner Saralee Thungthongkam.  They defeated Denyse Julien and Anna Rice of Canada in the first round, and Chikako Nakayama and Keiko Yoshimoti of Japan in the second.  In the quarterfinals, Chankrachangwong and Thungthongkam lost to Zhang Jiewen and Yang Wei of China 15-2, 15-4.

Achievements

Asian Championships 
Women's doubles

Southeast Asian Games 
Women's singles

Women's doubles

IBF World Grand Prix 
The World Badminton Grand Prix sanctioned by International Badminton Federation (IBF) since 1983.

Women's doubles

IBF International 
Women's doubles

Mixed doubles

References

External links 
 

1982 births
Living people
Sathinee Chankrachangwong
Sathinee Chankrachangwong
Badminton players at the 2004 Summer Olympics
Sathinee Chankrachangwong
Badminton players at the 1998 Asian Games
Badminton players at the 2002 Asian Games
Badminton players at the 2006 Asian Games
Sathinee Chankrachangwong
Asian Games medalists in badminton
Medalists at the 2002 Asian Games
Competitors at the 1999 Southeast Asian Games
Competitors at the 2001 Southeast Asian Games
Competitors at the 2005 Southeast Asian Games
Sathinee Chankrachangwong
Sathinee Chankrachangwong
Sathinee Chankrachangwong
Southeast Asian Games medalists in badminton